The Opel OHV family (also known as the Kadett engine and Viva engine after its most famous applications) is a pushrod inline-four engine. It was the first all-new engine developed by Opel of Germany after World War II and was released in 1962. Versions were in use through 1993.

Vauxhall would also make use of a locally built version of the OHV engine for the Vauxhall Viva, the original intention being to simply convert every component from metric dimensions to imperial measurements. However development of the OHV would soon be separate from to that of Opel, one of the first changes being to increase the size from 993cc to 1057cc via a slightly bigger 74mm bore yet built with the same stroke as the Opel OHV with later bore increases to 78mm and 81mm producing the 1159cc and 1256cc engines   that would also power the Bedford HA, Vauxhall Firenza, Vauxhall Chevette and Vauxhall Cavalier as well as the Holden Torana.

1.0
The first version of the engine was the 1.0 and placed in the Kadett A which was produced from 1962 to 1965.

This engine was retired in 1965 in favor of the 1.1 but was revived in 1973 as an economy option for the Kadett C. It was briefly discontinued in 1981 but revived a second time a year later for use in the Corsa A where it produced . It was also used in export market models of the Opel Kadett D.

Applications:
 1962-1965 Opel Kadett A
 1973-1979 Opel Kadett C
 1979-August 1981 Opel Kadett D
 September 1982 – 1993 Opel Corsa A / Vauxhall Nova

1.1

The 11N (normal compression) produced  and  after 1971.

Applications:
 1965-1973 Opel Kadett B
 1967-1970 Opel Olympia A
 1968-1970 Opel GT 1100

1.2

Applications:
 1971-1973 Opel Kadett B
 1973-1979 Opel Kadett C
 1979-1984 Opel Kadett D / Chevrolet Kadett (ZA) / Vauxhall Astra Mk 1
 1984-1988 Opel Kadett E / Vauxhall Astra Mk 2
 March 1972 – 1975 Opel Ascona A
 1975-1980 Opel Ascona B / Vauxhall Cavalier Mk 1
 1972-1975 Opel Manta A
 1975-1979 Opel Manta B
 1982-1993 Opel Corsa A / Vauxhall Nova (also with catalyst and )

References

 "Das große Kadett-Buch", Edition Heel, Königswinter, Germany
 Oswald, "Deutsche Pkw 1945-1990, Band 3: Ford, Opel, VW" Motorbuch-Verlag, Germany
 Oswald, Werner. Deutsche Autos 1945-1975. .

Opel OHV
Straight-four engines
Gasoline engines by model